Uir or UIR may refer to:

 International Broadcasting Union (IBU); 
 Úr, an Old Irish letter
 University of International Relations, a public university in Beijing, China
 United Islamic Republic, a fictional nation in Tom Clancy's book Executive Orders
 Upper information region, airspace
 Unity and Renewal, political party in Andorra
 Unidentified infrared emission
 Université Internationale de Rabat (International University of Rabat)
 Quirindi Airport, IATA airport code "UIR"